Hyland Gunning (August 6, 1888 – March 28, 1975) was a professional baseball player. He appeared in Major League Baseball (MLB) briefly for the Boston Red Sox during the 1911 season. He batted left-handed and threw right-handed. A native of Maplewood, New Jersey, he was signed by Boston out of the Princeton University.

In a four-game major-league career, Gunning had a .111 batting average (1-for-9) with two runs batted in (RBIs). Defensively as a first baseman, he recorded 25 put-outs and no assists, without any errors, for a 1.000 fielding percentage.

Gunning died in Togus, Maine, at age 86.

References

Sources

Boston Red Sox players
Major League Baseball first basemen
People from Maplewood, New Jersey
Sportspeople from Essex County, New Jersey
Princeton Tigers baseball players
Baseball players from New Jersey
1888 births
1975 deaths
Worcester Busters players
Montreal Royals players